The Cecil is a historic luxury hotel located in the hill station Shimla, India. The Cecil's address is at Chaura Maidan Rd, Nabha, Shimla, Himachal Pradesh 171004, India. At an elevation of seven thousand feet, it sits at the foothills of the Himalayas and overlooks nearby mountains and valleys.

History

The hotel was established in 1884 by the British but was later purchased by one of its employees, Mohan Singh Oberoi, who later founded the  Oberoi Hotels group, which presently owns and operates the property    

The Cecil had quite modest beginnings in 1883 as a one-storied house, the Tendril Cottage with its famed inhabitant, Rudyard Kipling. It is claimed that Kipling frequented the house where he wrote his novels, including Plain Tales from the Hills, which was inspired by Shimla. According to an account, Kipling would book himself into the cottage every summer for five consecutive years, making his journey from Lahore to the  British retreat. The author first set foot on The Cecil in the summer of 1883 when he was just 17.

Oberoi acquisition 
Rai Bahadur Mohan Singh Oberoi came to Shimla while he was a jobless newlywed to find work in the government. However, he was employed at The Cecil in 1922, starting as a staff in the boiler room, tasked with weighing coal sacks for the hotel's water heaters. He rose from the ranks until finally, he was able to acquire The Cecil as a part of the acquisition of the Associated Hotels of India in 1944. Oberoi's experiences, since he took every job possible at the hotel, helped him learn the hospitality trade and understand what motivates various classes of hotel guests. Under his ownership, The Cecil became the address that everyone wanted to be seen at and it was able to establish its own legacy of luxury.  For instance, the famous Balls and Floor shows and Lola, the dancer added to the reputation of the hotel.  

The hotel was closed in 1984 for extensive renovation and refurbishment and was reopened in 1997. The renovation included a heated swimming pool, billiards rooms, and a children activity center along with the customary amenities such as fine-dining restaurants and luxurious room.

It’s sister hotel “Cecil Hotel, Murree” was established in 1850 and was acquired by the Oberoi group in 1945. The hotel is now owned by the Hashwani group in Pakistan.

Literature

References

External links 
The Oberoi Cecil Homepage

The Oberoi Group
Hotels in India
Buildings and structures in Shimla
Heritage hotels in India
Hotels established in 1884
Houses in India

British-era buildings in Himachal Pradesh